EHG may refer to

 Eastern Hunter-Gatherer, an archaeogenetic lineage
 Eyehategod
 Ezdan Holding Group, a Qatari holding company
 Hagen Hauptbahnhof, a railway station in Hagen, Germany
 EH Güterverkehr, a subsidiary of Eisenbahn und Häfen GmbH
 Eskualdeko Hiri Garraioa, the Pamplona city transport